Rhondi A. Vilott Salsitz, born in Phoenix, Arizona, is a writer of science fiction, fantasy, and mystery novels.

She writes under the names Sara Hanover, Emily Drake, Anne Knight, Elizabeth Forrest, Charles Ingrid, Rhondi Greening, Rhondi Vilott Salsitz, Jenna Rhodes, R.A.V. Salsitz, and Rhondi Vilott.

Bibliography 
Crossroads of Darkover anthology (June 2018) "Trust" by Jenna Rhodes

Guilds & Glaives anthology (September 2018) "Rainbow Dark" by Jenna Rhodes

Tales of Plexis anthology (December 2018) "The Locksmith's Dilemma" by Rhondi Salsitz

Her works include:
The New Improved Sorceress DAW (January 2020) as Sara Hanover

The Late Great Wizard DAW (September 2018) as Sara Hanover

The Elven Ways series (epic fantasy) as Jenna Rhodes
 The Queen of Storm and Shadow DAW (May 2017)
 The King of Assassins DAW (November 2014)
 The Dark Ferryman (The Elven Ways: Book Two) DAW (June 2008) 
 The Four Forges (The Elven Ways: Book One) DAW (May 2006) The Magickers Chronicles Volume 1 (July 2010) as Emily Drake

The Magickers Chronicles Volume 2 (October 2010) as Emily Drake

The Marked Man omnibus December 2002

Sand Wars series (military science fiction, as Charles Ingrid):Sand Wars omnibus Volumes 1 & 2 (2001)
The Sand Wars, Volume 2 DAW
6 Challenge Met DAW (August 1990)
5 Return Fire DAW (August 1989)
4 Alien Salute DAW (March 1989)
The Sand Wars, Volume 1 DAW
3 Celestial Hit List DAW (November 1988)
2 Lasertown Blues DAW (February 1988)
1 Solar Kill DAW (July 1987)

Other:
 "Strong Armed" by Rhondi Ann Murder, Mystery & Mayhem anthology (October 2017)
 "The Windlost" by Jenna Rhodes Submerged anthology (September 2017)
 Gate of Bones (The Magickers series) DAW (Sept 2004) as Emily Drake
 Dragon Guard (The Magickers series) DAW (June 2003) as Emily Drake
 Curse of Arkady (The Magickers series) DAW (June 2002) as Emily Drake
 Death Storm DAW (October 1999) as Anne Knight
 Retribution DAW (May 1998) as Elizabeth Forrest
 Bright Shadow DAW (May 1997) as Elizabeth Forrest
 Killjoy DAW (June 1996) as Elizabeth Forrest
 Soul Fire DAW (October 1995) as Charles Ingrid
 Deathwatch DAW (June 1995) as Elizabeth Forrest
 Downfall Matrix DAW (September 1994) as Charles Ingrid
 Darktide DAW (September 1993) as Elizabeth Forrest
 Twilight Gate Walker (March 1993) as Rhondi Vilott Salsitz
 Path of Fire DAW (December 1992) as Charles Ingrid
 Phoenix Fire DAW (March 1992) as Elizabeth Forrest
 Radius of Doubt DAW (October 1991) as Charles Ingrid
 Last Recall DAW (January 1991) as Charles Ingrid
 Challenge Met DAW (August 1990) as Charles Ingrid
 Night of Dragons ROC (July 1990) as R.A.V. Salsitz
 The Marked Man DAW (December 1989) as Charles Ingrid
 Return Fire DAW (August 1989) as Charles Ingrid
 Alien Salute DAW (March 1989) as Charles Ingrid
 Celestial Hit List DAW (November 1988) as Charles Ingrid
 Daughter of Destiny NAL (November 1988) as R.A.V. Salsitz
 Lasertown Blues DAW (February 1988) as Charles Ingrid
 Where Dragons Rule NAL (December 1986) as R.A.V. Salsitz
 The Unicorn Dancer NAL (July 1986) as R.A.V. Salsitz
 Where Dragons Lie NAL (December 1985) as R.A.V. Salsitz
 Yellowstone Jewel Zebra (August 1983) as Rhondi Vilott
 Her Secret Self Bantam (November 1982) as Rhondi Vilott
 The Dragontales series, 14 interactive novels from Signet Books as Rhondi Vilott.

References

External links
 Author's Website
 Official Magickers Website
 Interview with Emily Drake

20th-century American novelists
21st-century American novelists
American children's writers
American fantasy writers
American science fiction writers
American women short story writers
American women novelists
1949 births
Living people
Writers from Phoenix, Arizona
American women children's writers
Women science fiction and fantasy writers
20th-century American women writers
21st-century American women writers
20th-century American short story writers
21st-century American short story writers
Novelists from Arizona